Vigilo NMS (Network Monitoring System) is a monitoring software capable of handling large-scale heterogeneous systems (network servers, software) thanks to a distributed and modular architecture. Built around Nagios, Vigilo additionally manages metrology, mapping, correlation and reporting.

It is released as an open-source software, published under the GNU GPL license.

Components 

Vigilo results from the integration of several open-source software:
 Nagios, a monitoring engine
 RRDTool, a metrology management system
 TurboGears, a Web framework
 RabbitMQ, an AMQP messaging bus
Talend, a data integration tool
 JasperReports Server, a reporting server

Modules 

Vigilo's main modules are:

 VigiBoard: Event Dashboard
 VigiMap: Mapping
 VigiGraph: Metrology
 VigiRules: Correlation
 VigiReport: Reporting
 VigiConf: Configuration management interface
 VigiAdmin: Users and rights management
 VigiBus: AMQP messaging Bus

Vigilo is mainly written in Python, with some components written in Perl.

Release history 

 January 2008 : Vigilo v1
 August 2008 : Vigilo v1.1
 May 2011 : Vigilo 2.0
 December 2012 : Vigilo 3.0
 August 2013 : Vigilo 3.3
 June 2014 : Vigilo 3.5
 July 2015 : Vigilo 3.5.1
 August 2016 : Vigilo v3.6.0
 April 2017 : Vigilo v4.0.0
 September 2017 : Vigilo v4.1.0

Publication 

Vigilo is released under the GNU GPL license.

Three versions are available:
 Vigilo OSS: available for download free of charge on the community website 
 Vigilo NMS: a more featureful version aimed at Enterprise deployments
 Vigilo NOC: made from the modules of Vigilo NMS with additional modules to build a complete NOC (Network Operations Center)

See also 

 Network monitoring
 System monitoring
 Website monitoring
 Application performance management
 Nagios, Vigilo's supervision engine
 Cacti, another interface for RDDTools

External links 
 Company Website
  Community Website
 choose Vigilo NMS ?

Free and open-source software
Network management
Unix software